Langstone may refer to:

Places:
 Langstone, Devon, a location in England
 Langstone, Hampshire, England
 Langstone (UK Parliament constituency)
 Langstone, Newport, Wales

People:
 Frank Langstone
 John Langstone
 Michelle Langstone

See also
 Langston (disambiguation)